A minibike is a two-wheeled, motorized, off-highway recreational vehicle popularized in the 1960s and 1970s, but available continuously from a wide variety of manufacturers since 1959. Their off-highway nature and (in many countries) typically entirely off-road legal status differentiate minibikes from motorcycles and mopeds, and their miniature size differentiates them from dirt bikes.

Traditionally, minibikes have a four-stroke, horizontal crankshaft engine, single- or two-speed centrifugal clutch transmissions with chain final-drive, 4" or 6" wheels and a low frame/seat height with elevated handlebars. Commercially available minibikes are usually equipped with small engines commonly found elsewhere on utilitarian equipment such as garden tillers

History 

While the minibike had precursors in machines such as the Doodle Bug and Cushman Scooters, which share smaller wheels, tubular-steel frames, and air-cooled, single-cylinder engines, those vehicles had larger seat heights and lighting that allow them to be registered for road use as scooters. In the 1950s, minibikes were hand-made by enthusiasts. These were first popularly used as pit bikes, for drag racers to travel in the staging-areas during races. One of these "Pit bikes" was received by brothers Ray, Larry and Regis Michrina in early 1959 from a local car dealer and racer Troy Ruttman.

The Michrina Brothers would create the first commercial minibikes by drawing inspiration from this Pit Bike, delivering 3 prototypes to Troy Ruttman to sell through his dealership. The Michrina brothers are credited with creating the minibike but failed to patent the design or trademark the term when founding their Lil Indian brand in 1959. Lil Indian would go on to manufacture tens-of-thousands of minibikes in their 40+ years. From the mid-1960s into the 1970s, the popularity of said machines would see over a hundred manufacturers attempt to market machines, an inexpensive venture due to the absence of patents. So popular and simple was the design, the June of  1967 Popular Mechanics magazine included an article with plans.

As the market for minibikes developed, a variety of cottage and major industries offered models, including Arctic Cat, Rupp, Taco, Heath, Gilson, and Fox. Traditional motorcycle manufacturers also released models inspired by aspects of minibikes, most famously Honda with the Z50A, though this style was affectionately known as a Monkey Bike, a slang-term due to its street-legal demographic requiring a seminarian riding position. Sales peaked in the 1973, with 140,000 units between manufacturers. By 1976 the bubble had burst and less than ten manufactures continued to make minibikes. Popularity declined steadily, but leveled off in the early 1990s. Currently, machines can still be found at various retailers for less than $800.

Recently there has been a trend of adult sized electric minibikes.

Legal status

In some jurisdictions, it is not legal to operate minibikes in certain places or without regulatory-specified special equipment.

Canada
Minibikes do not meet Federal safety standards for use on public roads.

UK
It is not legal for Minibikes to be used on public roads or land. Further, it is not legal to use Minibikes on a property in proximity to a population if cited for noise pollution.

US
Whilst laws vary by state, Minibikes became unlawful for use on public through-ways due to lack of safety equipment, lights, and their diminutive size causing visibility issues. In 1977, the CPSC was unsuccessfully lobbied to add federal regulation to Minibikes. By 1979 in the US, Minibikes could not be operated on public roads, they could still operate in areas legal for use of other recreational vehicles, provided they had a specified set of proper equipment utilized at the time of sale, most notably a spark arrestor for the exhaust. In many US states mini bikes can be made street legal.

See also 
 All-terrain vehicle
 Honda Z series - also known as a Monkey bike.
 Mini chopper
 Pit bike
 Pocketbike
 Tote Gote

References

External links 
 Good Hiawatha Doodle Bug pic

 
 Royal Society for the Prevention of Accidents – Mini Motorbike Safety Factsheet (PDF)